Lower Mettur Hydroelectric Project is a hydropower generation project in the South Indian state of Tamil Nadu. It is a 120MW power generation project constructed across the Kaveri River. The project area is in the downstream of Mettur Dam, hence it derives the name. This project consists of four power plants which are located between Mettur in Salem district and Bhavani, Erode. This power generation project is owned by Government of Tamil Nadu and operated by TANGEDCO.

Power Plants
This project involves a series of power plants each with Barrage type Dam, constructed across the River Kaveri to divert the stream to where the power house is located. It consists of four Barrages each of which receives water current in a serial manner.
 Power Plant-I : Named as Chekkanur Barrage with Hydroelectric power generation capacity of 30MW. This Barrage has one powerhouse and two turbine units, each of 15MW production capacity.
 Power Plant-II : Named as Nerinjipettai Barrage with Hydroelectric power generation capacity of 30MW. This Barrage has one powerhouse on the western banks of the river and two turbines, each of 15MW Capacity.
 Power Plant-III : Named as Kuthiraikkalmedu Barrage with Hydroelectric power generation capacity of 30MW. This Barrage has one powerhouse on the western banks of the river and two turbines, each of 15MW Capacity.
 Power Plant-IV : Named as Urachikottai Barrage with Hydroelectric power generation capacity of 30MW. This Barrage has one powerhouse on the western banks of the river and two turbines, each of 15MW Capacity.

References

Erode district
Salem district
Hydroelectric power stations in Tamil Nadu
1988 establishments in Tamil Nadu
Energy infrastructure completed in 1988
20th-century architecture in India